Maiden uniteD is an acoustic project. Musicians from different bands join together to play an all-acoustic tribute to English heavy metal band Iron Maiden. The songs are played with new arrangements.

About
In 2006, Joey Bruers was asked to perform a tribute at a convention for the Dutch Iron Maiden fan club in Dynamo, Eindhoven. Together with several musicians he played a set of acoustic Iron Maiden songs. Steve Harris attended the convention and gave the band ‘two thumbs up’.

There were a few more shows like this and then he started to write new acoustic arrangements for a series of songs with Ruud Jolie (Within Temptation).

They began to search for musicians to record these songs and on 9 December 2010 their first album was released; Mind the Acoustic Pieces, an all-acoustic reinterpretation of Iron Maiden’s classic album Piece of Mind.

The album was supported by the "Pieces Over Europe Tour" (December 2010 - April 2011). Maiden uniteD played at the 2011 Wacken Open Air festival in Germany and they played at the 2011 Download festival in the UK.

Their second album 'Across The Seventh Sea' was released in September 2012 and followed by a European tour in November and December. This album contains rearranged songs from several Iron Maiden albums. Perttu Kivilaakso (Apocalyptica) plays cello on the tracks 'The Evil That Men Do' and 'Infinite Dreams'.

Maiden uniteD brought their third album Remembrance out in 2015. There are also special guests on this album such as ex Iron Maiden singers Paul Di'Anno and Blaze Bayley. Next to them are Wudstik, Marcela Bovio of Stream of Passion and ex Iron Maiden drummer Thunderstick also on the album. A European tour follows from September through December.

Discography

Albums
Mind the Acoustic Pieces (2010)
Mind the Acoustic Pieces (ltd. Vinyl edition) (2011)
Across the Seventh Sea (2012)
Across the Seventh Sea (ltd. Vinyl edition) (2012)
Remembrance (2015)
Empire of the Clouds [E.P.] (2018)
The Barrel House Tapes (2019)

Singles
 The Trooper/Sun and Steel (with Anneke van Giersbergen on vocals) (2011)
 Strange World (2015)

Current members
 Damian Wilson (Threshold, Ayreon, Star One, Headspace, Landmarq): Vocals
 Ruud Jolie (Within Temptation, For all we Know): Guitar
 Joey Bruers (Up The Irons): : Bass
 Stef Broks (Textures): Drums
 Thijs Schrijnemakers (Orgel Vreten): Keyboards

Guest Members on Tour
Perttu Kivilaakso (Apocalyptica): Cello 
Anneke van Giersbergen (formerly The Gathering), (Devin Townsend), (Ayreon): Vocals 
Luke Appleton (Blaze Bayley, Absolva): Bass 
Lee Morris (formerly Paradise Lost): Drums 
Huub van Loon (Dearworld): Keyboards 
Joe Lazarus (Voodoo Six): Drums 
Marcela Bovio (formerly Stream of Passion), (MaYaN), (Ayreon): Vocals 
Martijn Balsters (The Dust Connection): Guitar 
Wudstik (Ayreon), (For all we Know): Vocals 
Tom Sikkers (Daybroke): Guitar 
Dennis Stratton (formerly Iron Maiden): Guitar

Former members
 Marco Kuypers (Cloudmachine): Piano
 Mike Coolen (Within Temptation): Drums

Concert tours
{List of Maiden United concert tours}

External links
 Maiden uniteD

References

Tribute bands
Iron Maiden (band)